"Ternatin" is a term used for two unrelated categories of biochemical compounds:

 The ternatin heptapeptide  derived from the mushroom Coriolus versicolor
 Delphinidin ternatins  derivatives of delphinidin, an anthocyanidin

Biochemistry terminology